Giovanni Esposito (born 14 June 1970) is an Italian actor, comedian, and cabaret artist. He works in theater, cinema, and television.

Biography
Esposito was born in Naples and studied acting there. From 1993 to 1995, he attended the Academy of Dramatic Art at the Teatro Bellini in Naples. From 1991, he was seen in various TV productions on Italian television, including small roles on the Pippo Chennedy Show, Mai dire..., as well as with Gialappa's Band. National and international projects followed, including supporting roles in Florian Henckel von Donnersmarck's 2010 film The Tourist and Tomy Wigand's comedy  (2012). In 2009, Esposito made the short film Bisesto, which was nominated for a David di Donatello for Best Short Film award.

Selected filmography

References

External links
 

1970 births
Living people
Italian male film actors